Tilloclytus pilosus is a species of longhorn beetle in the Cerambycinae subfamily. It was described by Zayas in 1975. It is known from Cuba.

References

Anaglyptini
Beetles described in 1975
Endemic fauna of Cuba